The 2018 SLC T20 League was a domestic Twenty20 cricket tournament that was held in Sri Lanka, between 21 August and 2 September 2018. Four teams took part in the tournament: Colombo, Dambulla, Galle and Kandy. The Rangiri Dambulla International Stadium, Pallekele International Cricket Stadium and the R. Premadasa Stadium hosted all the matches.

The third match, between Colombo and Kandy, finished as a tie, therefore going to a Super Over to determine the winner. However, the match was still tied after the Super Over, with both teams scoring five runs each. Colombo were declared the eventual winners, as they had scored the most boundaries.

Colombo were the first team to qualify for the final, after remaining unbeaten in their first four matches. They were joined in the final by Dambulla, who finished second in the group stage. Colombo won the final by 7 wickets, with Upul Tharanga scoring an unbeaten century.

Squads
The following teams and squads were named to compete in the tournament:

Points table

  Top two teams advanced to the final

Fixtures

Group stage

Final

References

External links
 Series home at ESPN Cricinfo

SLC T20 League
SLC Twenty20 Tournament